{{Infobox person
| name          = Lucas Meachem
| image         = 
| alt           = 
| caption       = 
| birth_name    = John Lucas Meachem
| birth_date    = June 11, 1978
| birth_place   = 
| death_date    = 
| nationality   = American
| citizenship   = United States
| education     = 
| alma_mater    = 
| occupation    = Lyric Baritone 
| years_active  = 
| era           = 
| employer      = 
| known_for     = performing the role of Figaro in  2016 Los Angeles Opera's Ghosts of Versailles
| website       = 
}}

John Lucas Meachem (born June 11, 1978) (known professionally as Lucas Meachem) is an American lyric baritone known for performing the role of Figaro in  2016 Los Angeles Opera's Ghosts of Versailles which earned him a Grammy Award.

Early life
Lucas Meachem was born and raised in Carthage, North Carolina and grew up singing karaoke before discovering opera. Meachem trained at the Adler Program artist residency at the San Francisco Opera from 2004-2005. He had his big break soon after that in 2006, when he was discovered at a karaoke bar in Paris by acclaimed mezzo-soprano Susan Graham, who suggested he step in for Gluck’s Iphigénie en Tauride at the Lyric Opera of Chicago from which the international star baritone Simon Keenlyside had withdrawn.

Career
Meachem made his Metropolitan Opera debut as General Rayevsky in War and Peace in 2008, and has since performed at the Met as Mercutio in Roméo et Juliette, Silvio in Pagliacci, and most recently Marcello in La bohème.

In 2016, Meachem won a Grammy for Los Angeles Opera's Ghosts of Versailles as Figaro. Also in 2016, Meachem was voted as the inaugural Emerging Star by San Francisco Opera.

In 2021, Meachem performed the role of Figaro in an abridged English-language adaptation of The Barber of Seville'' for the San Francisco Opera. The production was held as an open-air, drive-in event at the Marin Center due to the COVID-19 pandemic.

Personal life
Meachem is married to pianist/opera coach, Irina Meachem. They have a son, and live in Minneapolis.

Discography

CD

DVD

See also
 Ghosts of Versailles
 Grammy Award for Best Opera Recording
 59th Annual Grammy Awards
 Phoenicia International Festival of the Voice
 Metropolitan Opera
 La bohème

References

Living people
1978 births
American baritones
American operatic baritones
People from Carthage, North Carolina
21st-century American singers
21st-century American male singers